The College of Pharmacy, located at Narhe in the outskirts of Pune, India, operates under the banner of the Abhinav Education Society. The college was established in 2007 and offers a 4-year graduation course in Pharmacy (Bachelor of Pharmacy). The degree is awarded by the University of Pune. The Principal is R. D. Patankar.

This is one of ten unaided colleges which started pharmacy from academic session 2007–08.

One of the lecturers, Keyur V. Shastri, has produced an essay on the chiropractic field.

References

Pharmacy colleges in Maharashtra
Universities and colleges in Pune
Colleges affiliated to Savitribai Phule Pune University
Educational institutions established in 2007
2007 establishments in Maharashtra